Tristaniopsis littoralis is a species of plant in the family Myrtaceae. It is endemic to the Philippines. It is threatened by habitat loss.

References

littoralis
Endemic flora of the Philippines
Vulnerable plants
Taxonomy articles created by Polbot